

The Avro 539 was a British single-seat racing biplane built by Avro for the 1919 Schneider Trophy.

Development
The Avro 539 (later 539A) was a single-seat floatplane first flown on 29 August 1919. It was a single-bay, unstaggered biplane with a nose-mounted 240 hp (180 kW) Siddeley Puma piston engine and twin wooden floats. It had a single open cockpit for the pilot aft of the wings. Registered G-EALG it was modified before the race with a balanced rudder and elongated fin. The Schneider Trophy was held on 10 September 1919 but the 539 was eliminated. It was later modified as a landplane with a smaller fin and flown at the Aerial Derby in July 1920. The aircraft forced landed but was rebuilt as the Avro 539B for the 1921 Aerial Derby with a 450 hp (340 kW) Napier Lion and revised landing gear and registered G-EAXM. It was destroyed in a landing accident at Hamble on 15 July 1921 on the eve of the race.

Variants
Avro 539A
Schneider Trophy floatplane with a 240 hp (180 kW)  Siddeley Puma engine, later modified as a landplane, rebuilt as the Avro 539A after a forced landing.
Avro 539B
539A rebuilt with a 450 hp (340 kW) Napier Lion engine.

Specifications (539A)

See also

References

External links
 Avro 539 – British Aircraft Directory

1910s British sport aircraft
539
Floatplanes
Schneider Trophy
Biplanes
Single-engined tractor aircraft
Aircraft first flown in 1919